Shashi may refer to:

Places and jurisdictions

China
Shashi City, Hubei from 1949 to 1994
Shashi District, Jingzhou, Hubei (historically, Shashi City) since 1994
 Apostolic Prefecture of Shashi
 Jingmen–Shashi railway, single-track railway in Hubei province, China
Shashi, Liuyang (沙市镇), town in Hunan province
Shashi, Shaodong (砂石镇), town of Shaodong County, Hunan province

Africa
Shashi River or Shashe River, major left-bank tributary of the Limpopo River in Zimbabwe

People 
Shashi is an Indian and Nepali male and female name, abstracted from ancient Sanskrit language, meaning "Moon".

Politics
 Shashi Kumar (born 1965), actor and politician from Karnataka, India
 Shashi Shrestha, Nepalese politician, Central Committee member of Janamorcha Nepal
 Shashi Tharoor (born 1956), Indian Minister of State for Human Resource Development

Culture, science and entertainment
Shashi Caan, American architect, designer, advocacy icon, founder of The Shashi Caan Collective
Shashibhusan Dasgupta (1911–1964), Bengali scholar of philosophy, languages and literature
Shashi Deshpande (born 1938), Indian novelist
Shashi Gupta (born 1964), Indian Test and One Day International cricketer
Shashi Isaac (born 1982), football player (midfielder) from Saint Kitts & Nevis
Shashikala (1933–2021), Indian actress
Shashi Kapoor (1938–2017), Indian film actor, director and producer
Shashi P. Karna (born 1956), Indian-American nanotechnology
Shashi Naidoo (born 1980), South African actress, model and television anchor
Shashi Nambisan, Indian-born director of the Center for Transportation Research and Education at Iowa State University
Shashi Puri, Hindi film actor
Shashi Warrier, Indian author of Hangman's Journal

Other 
 Shashi language or Ikizu language, a Bantu language spoken by the Ikizu peoples of Tanzania

See also 
 Sasi (disambiguation)
 Shashthi
 Shashti

Indian given names